Julio César Martínez (born 23 March 1962) is an Argentine politician, currently serving as a National Senator for La Rioja since 2017. A member of the Radical Civic Union (UCR), he previously served as Minister of Defense under President Mauricio Macri, as a National Deputy, and as a member of the Legislature of La Rioja.

Early life
Martínez was born on 23 March 1962 in Chilecito, La Rioja Province. He studied agricultural engineering at the National University of Córdoba, graduating with a licenciatura in 1986.

Political career
Martínez became politically active in the Radical Civic Union (UCR). In 1999, he was elected to the Legislature of La Rioja. Later, in the 2003 general election, he ran for one of La Rioja's seats in the National Chamber of Deputies as part of the UCR list; he was elected with 30.39% as the only UCR deputy from La Rioja.

As part of the Chamber of Deputies, he was a member of the parliamentary commission on national defense. He was a vocal critic of many of President Néstor Kirchner's defense policies, such as the modernisation of the FMA IA-63 Pampa and the purchase of new aircraft for the Argentine Air Force, as well as the appointment of César Milani as General of the Argentine Army's Estado Mayor General.

He ran for re-election in the 2007 legislative election, but the UCR list received less than 22% of the vote, not enough for Martínez (or any other candidates in the list) to make it past the D'Hondt cut. He would run again in 2009, this time as part of the Social and Civic Agreement list, and he was elected. He was re-elected for a third term in the 2013 legislative election, as the first candidate in the Frente Cívico Riojano (FCR) list. Both lists came very close in the voting, with a difference of merely 1,000 votes between them.

Gubernatorial candidacies
Martínez first ran for governor of La Rioja in the 2011 provincial elections. As the Civic Front for Change candidate, he sought to challenge the re-election bid of Justicialist Party governor Luis Beder Herrera. Beder Herrera won the re-election with 67.2% of the votes against Martínez's 19.6%.

He tried to once again run for governor in the 2015 provincial elections, this time backed by the Cambiemos coalition (including Republican Proposal, the Civic Coalition ARI and the Socialist Party). However, he once again fell short and lost with 39.32% of the votes against the PJ candidate Sergio Casas's 56.74%.

Defense minister
On 10 December 2015, following the election of Mauricio Macri as President of Argentina, Martínez was appointed as Minister of Defense in the incoming cabinet, taking over from Agustín Rossi. One of his first acts as minister was Martínez shutting down plans for a state-commissioned revamp of Air Force planes.

In June 2016, on Martínez's orders, criminals sentenced for crimes against humanity (namely those who participated in the 1976–1983 military dictatorship) were once again allowed to receive medical treatment at military hospitals, reverting a resolution passed by former minister Rossi. Martínez also supported granting dictatorship collaborators home arrest due to their advanced age.

His administration saw a general setback for military development in Argentina, as part of the Macri administration's austerity policies. The renovation project for the Puerto Belgrano Naval Base was paralyzed, as was the renovation of ARA Santa Cruz, one of the Argentine Navy's three (at the time) submarines, and a project to produce the second series of six radars built by Fabricaciones Militares and INVAP was scrapped altogether.

National senator
In the 2017 legislative election, Martínez ran for one of La Rioja's three seats in the National Senate, as the first candidate in the Cambiemos list. His list ran again the list headed by former president and longtime peronist senator Carlos Menem. In what was described as an upset, Martínez's list came first, with 48.02% of the vote, against Menem's 45.50%. Martínez was thus elected for the majority.

As a national senator, he formed part of the parliamentary commissions on Administrative and Municipal Affairs, Budgets and Treasury, National Defense, Agriculture and Livestock, and the Bicameral Commission on Social Security Funds Accountability. He also presided the commission on Rights and Guarantees. He was an opponent of the 2020 Voluntary Interruption of Pregnancy Bill, which legalised abortion in Argentina.

Personal life
Martínez is married to Laura Rebeca Waidatt, with whom he has three children.

Electoral history

Executive

Legislative

References

External links

1962 births
Living people
People from La Rioja Province, Argentina
National University of Córdoba alumni
Radical Civic Union politicians
Members of the Argentine Chamber of Deputies elected in La Rioja
Members of the Argentine Senate for La Rioja
Defense ministers of Argentina